Shimulia Union is a union parishad of Khoksa Upazila, in Kushtia District, Khulna Division of Bangladesh. There are 9 villages and 8 mouzas in the union.

References

External links
 

Unions of Khulna Division
Unions of Khoksa Upazila
Unions of Kushtia District